Year as Long as Life is a 1966 Soviet drama film directed by Grigori Roshal.

Plot 
The film takes place in Europe in the 19th century. The film shows the popular uprisings that took place there, as well as the search for truth and the confrontation of Karl Marx and opponents of the revolution.

Cast 
 Igor Kvasha as Karl Marx
 Andrey Mironov as Friedrich Engels
 Rufina Nifontova
 Anatoliy Solovyov
 Aleksey Alekseev
 Vasiliy Livanov
 Vladimir Balashov
 Svetlana Kharitonova
 Lev Zolotukhin
 Olga Gobzeva

References

External links 
 

1966 films
1960s Russian-language films
Soviet drama films
Works about Karl Marx
1966 drama films